Maurício Plenckauskas Cordeiro (born 31 December 1992 in Brazil) is a Brazilian footballer who now plays for Hồ Chí Minh City in Vietnam.

Career
Cordeiro started his senior career with Grêmio Barueri Futebol. In 2016, he signed for Hapoel Ironi Kiryat Shmona in the Israeli Premier League, where he made thirty-eight appearances and scored seven goals. After that, he played for Ashdod, Esporte Clube Vitória, and Nea Salamis Famagusta.

On 10 August 2020 signed in Hapoel Afula.

References 

1992 births
Living people
Brazilian footballers
Grêmio Barueri Futebol players
Avaí FC players
Oeste Futebol Clube players
Mirassol Futebol Clube players
Red Bull Brasil players
Clube Atlético Penapolense players
Hapoel Ironi Kiryat Shmona F.C. players
F.C. Ashdod players
Esporte Clube Vitória players
Nea Salamis Famagusta FC players
Hapoel Afula F.C. players
Hapoel Jerusalem F.C. players
Israeli Premier League players
Cypriot First Division players
Liga Leumit players
Expatriate footballers in Israel
Expatriate footballers in Cyprus
Brazilian expatriate sportspeople in Israel
Brazilian expatriate sportspeople in Cyprus
Association football forwards